Hidden Valley is a valley in the Santa Monica Mountains, in southeastern Ventura County, Southern California. The unincorporated community in the valley is an equestrian ranch community with single family houses on  parcels of land. Residents rely on wells as the Hidden Valley Municipal Water District does not provide drinking water.

Geography

Hidden Valley is bordered by Lake Sherwood to the east, Newbury Park to the west and north, and the Santa Monica Mountains National Recreation Area to the south. It is located south of the Conejo Valley, near the northwestern border of Los Angeles County.

Popular culture
Hidden Valley is popular for filming movies and television shows due to its proximity to Los Angeles, such as:
the home of President Charles Logan in the television series 24, seasons 5 and 6,
much of the film Seabiscuit,
the original site for Greg Sumner's ranch on Knots Landing,
the original site for Gary Ewing's ranch on Knots Landing.
location scenes for American Horror Story: Asylum, 
the video for "Forever Young" by Rod Stewart, shot on Potrero Road in Hidden Valley,
the site of the Rosemoor Zoological Park in We Bought A Zoo,
and the site of Perry Mason's family home in Perry Mason.

Notable people
Ellen DeGeneres and Portia de Rossi previously owned a horse ranch in the valley.
Andrew Lee is an American entrepreneur, software developer and writer.
Britney Spears owns a villa at the White Stallion Estates in the valley.
Tom Selleck owns a ranch formerly of actor/singer Dean Martin.

See also
Circle X Ranch
Flora of the Santa Monica Mountains

References

Valleys of Ventura County, California
Unincorporated communities in Ventura County, California
Geography of Thousand Oaks, California
Populated places in the Santa Monica Mountains
Santa Monica Mountains
Unincorporated communities in California